Title 48 of the United States Code outlines the role of United States territories and insular areas in the United States Code.

 : Bureau of Insular Affairs
 : Alaska
 : Hawaii
 : Puerto Rico
 : Philippine Islands
 : Panama Canal Zone
 : Virgin Islands
 : Guano Islands
 : Guam
 : Samoa, Tutuila, Manua, Swains Island, and Trust Territory of the Pacific Islands
 : Territorial Provisions of a General Nature
 : Alien Owners of Land
 : Virgin Islands
 : Eastern Samoa
 : Trust Territory of the Pacific Islands
 : Conveyance of Submerged Lands to Territories
 : Delegates to Congress
 : Northern Mariana Islands
 : Micronesia, Marshall Islands, and Palau
 : Pacific Policy Reports
 : PROMESA

External links

U.S. Code Title 48, via United States Government Printing Office
U.S. Code Title 48, via Cornell University

48
Title 48